Dombeya acutangula, the bois bete or mahot tantan, is a flowering plant species found only in Mauritius and Réunion. Formerly placed in the family Sterculiaceae, this artificial assemblage is now included in the Malvaceae by most authors.

It has charming pale (white or light pink) flowers in small clusters. The natural habitat is subtropical or tropical dry forests but it is almost extinct due to habitat loss; some 50 plants remain in the wild, growing in a narrowly circumscribed area at Corps de garde, Trois Mamelles, Yemen, Magenta and Chamarel.

Systematics
Bois bete was sometimes placed in Pentapetes. It is somewhat variable and thus was described under a number of names, which are now considered junior synonyms:
 Pentapetes acutangula Poir.
 Pentapetes angulosa Poir.
 Pentapetes palmata Poir.

This species is rather isolated among its congeners and may belong to the more basal members of its genus. It differs both from the "xeric forest" group of Mascarene Dombeya (e.g. D. mauritiana and D. rodriguesiana) and the "rainforest group" (e.g. D. blattiolens and D. ciliata).

Footnotes

References

  (2006): Does minimizing homoplasy really maximize homology? MaHo: A method for evaluating homology among most parsimonious trees. C. R. Palevol 7(1): 17–26.  (HTML abstract)
  (2008): Partial Synonymy of Dombeya. Retrieved 2008-JUN-25.

acutangula
Critically endangered plants
Flora of Réunion
Flora of Mauritius
Taxonomy articles created by Polbot
Taxa named by Antonio José Cavanilles